Esko Tapani Aho (born 20 May 1954) is a Finnish politician who was prime minister of Finland from 1991 to 1995.

Early life and career 
Aho was born in Veteli, Finland.  Prior to attending university, he began a career in politics.  From 1974 to 1979, he was chairman of the Finnish Centre Youth, many of whose previous chairmen had risen to high political positions.  In 1978, he became a presidential elector, a position he also held in 1982 and 1998.  From 1979 to 1980, Aho was political secretary of the Ministry of Foreign Affairs.  From 1980 to 1983, he was a trade promoter for the municipality of Kannus.

Aho studied at the University of Helsinki, receiving a Master of Social Science in 1981.

Since 2010 he has been a member of the board of the Skolkovo Innovation Center. Currently, he is a visiting professor at Sciences Po, Paris.

Parliamentary career 

Aho was first elected to the Finnish Parliament (eduskunta) in 1983.  He became chairman of the Centre Party in 1990, a position that he held until 2002.  The party is one of three major political parties in Finland.

At 36 years of age, he was the youngest prime minister in Finnish history.

Aho was the prime minister of a centre-right coalition government (Centre Party, National Coalition Party, Christian Democrats and Swedish People's Party) from 1991 to 1995. He is best known for leading Finland into the European Union. Aho's own party, most of whose voters lived and live in rural areas, was the most opposed to EU membership among major parties. The greatest concern of these voters was the EU's effect on Finnish agriculture, but they were persuaded to support membership due to the prime minister's diplomacy. Finland applied for EU membership on 16 March 1992, and a referendum was held two and a half years later. Aho's government also faced the deep economic depression of the early 1990s. Despite a steep rise in the national debt, the Aho government applied a stringent policy of austerity that made it unpopular. This partly caused its fall in the 1995 election and the Centre Party's eight-year period in the opposition.

Aho had the nickname "Kennedy of Kannus" Kannus being his hometown) due to his streamlined and well coiffed habitus reminiscent of John F. Kennedy.

Esko Aho lost the bid for President of Finland to Tarja Halonen in 2000. He subsequently retired from active politics, initially in the form of a "sabbatical leave" of one year, during which he lead a study group on the EU in the 2000 fall semester at Harvard University (where he was a resident fellow at the Institute of Politics). In the 2003 election he left parliament and retired from daily politics. He then served as the president of the Finnish national innovation fund SITRA (the Finnish National Fund for Research and Development).

In 2008, Aho's name was included in an opinion poll on possible presidential candidates, in which he ranked last.

On 1 November 2008, Aho became Nokia's executive vice president of corporate relations and responsibility and became a member of its executive board.

At the time of his rise to prime minister, he was the youngest head of government in Europe.

Banks 
Aho became a member of the board of directors of the Russian Sberbank in 2016. He resigned from the position in February 2022 following the Russian invasion of Ukraine.

Cabinets 
 Aho Cabinet

See also 
 Aho report

References 

1954 births
Living people
People from Veteli
Centre Party (Finland) politicians
Prime Ministers of Finland
Speakers of the Parliament of Finland
Members of the Parliament of Finland (1983–87)
Members of the Parliament of Finland (1987–91)
Members of the Parliament of Finland (1991–95)
Members of the Parliament of Finland (1995–99)
Members of the Parliament of Finland (1999–2003)
Nokia people
University of Helsinki alumni
Recipients of the Order of the Cross of Terra Mariana, 1st Class
Candidates for President of Finland